The Frontier League is a professional independent baseball league with teams in the Northeastern and Midwestern United States and Eastern Canada. Formed in 1993, it is the oldest currently running independent league in the United States. The league is headquartered in Sauget, Illinois. In 2020, the Frontier League, together with the American Association and the Atlantic League, became an official MLB Partner League.

The league has a partnership agreement with the California Winter League for player development.

Structure and history
Teams in the Frontier League must recruit and sign their own players, who usually are undrafted college players or one-time prospects who have been released by their teams.

Frontier League rules limit teams to three "veterans" (Players older than 29 years as of October 1), while a minimum of ten of the 24-man roster are required to be rookies.

Typically, teams play a 96-game regular season from May to September.

Pay in the Frontier League is minimal. For the 2020 season, each team had a salary cap of $85,000 and the player salaries ranged from a minimum of $600 up to $1,600 per month. Veterans could earn up to $2,500 per month, and each team's highest-paid player could make as much as $4,000 a month with only one-third of the salary counting against the cap.

Due to the low pay, players typically live with host families and receive meal money during the season.

The first league champions were the Zanesville Greys. Eight teams have won more than one championship: Springfield in 1996 and 1998; Johnstown in 1995 (as the Steal) and in 2000 (as the Johnnies), Richmond Roosters in 2001 and 2002, Windy City in 2007 and 2008, the Joliet Slammers in 2011 and 2018, and the Evansville Otters in 2006 and 2016. With four titles, the Schaumburg Boomers have won the most league championships.

On June 20, 2000, Brian Tollberg debuted with the San Diego Padres, becoming the first player from the Frontier League to make it to the Majors. A week later, Morgan Burkhart made his debut with the Boston Red Sox.

Although the league does not have any teams located in the same city as Major League teams, it does nonetheless have teams located within the markets of Major League teams. The Chicago area has three teams (Joliet Slammers, Schaumburg Boomers and Windy City ThunderBolts), as does the New York area (New Jersey Jackals, Sussex County Miners, and New York Boulders), and St. Louis (Gateway Grizzlies), Cleveland (Lake Erie Crushers), Cincinnati (Florence Y'alls) and Pittsburgh (Washington Wild Things) each have one. The Wild Things, in particular, have been able to market themselves as a successful alternative to the Pittsburgh Pirates due to the latter franchise's long stretch of losing seasons, which lasted from the Frontier League's founding in 1993 until 2013 when the Pirates finished with a record of 94–68.

2019–2020: Merger, MLB Partner League 
On October 16, 2019, it was announced that the Frontier League would be merging with the Canadian American Association of Professional Baseball, absorbing five of its teams to form the largest independent professional baseball league. This added the New Jersey Jackals, New York Boulders, Quebec Capitales, Sussex County Miners, and Trois-Rivieres Aigles to the league; the Ottawa Champions, the last remaining Can-Am League team, was not invited to participate. The divisions were renamed, with the easternmost teams playing in the Can-Am Division and the westernmost in the Midwestern Division. 

On September 24, 2020, Major League Baseball announced that it named the Frontier League an MLB Partner League. This enables collaboration with MLB to jointly discuss marketing and promotional initiatives to grow, expand, and enhance the game of baseball.

2021: New teams, border issues 
For the 2021 season, the Frontier League announced it would be adding two new teams. The first announcement came around the same time as the announcement of the partnership with Major League Baseball, as Ottawa was granted an expansion franchise in the league. The team, as chosen by fans in a contest, was named the Titans and will play at RCGT Park. Then, on January 8, 2021, after the reorganization of Minor League Baseball, the league added the Tri-City ValleyCats, which were one of several teams that were orphaned or disbanded when the New York-Penn League was folded. The Titans and ValleyCats joined the five former Can-Am League teams and Washington in the Can-Am Division; to even the divisions at seven teams, Lake Erie was moved to the Midwestern Division.

In April 2021, the league announced that the Québec Capitales, the Trois-Rivières Aigles, and the Ottawa Titans would not compete in the 2021 season due to the prolonged closure of the Canada–United States border as a result of the ongoing COVID-19 pandemic. The Titans, the Aigles and the Capitales later joined forces to form a new team that competed as a member of the Atlantic Division. Known as Équipe Québec, they began the season as a traveling team, and starting on July 30, 2021, started sharing home games between Québec City and Trois-Rivières following a loosening in border restrictions. 10 games were played in Québec City and 11 in Trois-Rivières. They did not play in Ottawa due to COVID-19 restrictions in Ontario.

On October 6, 2021, the owners of the Southern Illinois Miners, Jayne and John Simmons, announced they would be retiring from professional baseball to spend more time with family and the Miners would be ceasing operations and dropping out of the Frontier League. As a result, the league formed the Empire State Greys, to compete as a traveling team with a roster of players from the Empire Professional Baseball League.

Broadcasting 
On February 24, 2022, the Frontier League announced that all games for the 2022 season would be available through the streaming platform FloSports.

Teams

Former teams
Canton Coyotes (2002, became the Mid-Missouri Mavericks)
Canton Crocodiles (1997–2002, became the Washington Wild Things)
Chillicothe Paints (1993–2008, joined the Prospect League)
Dubois County Dragons (2000–2002, became the Kenosha Mammoths)
Erie Sailors (1994, became the Johnstown Steal)
Florence Freedom (2003–2019, became the Florence Y'alls)
Johnstown Johnnies (1998–2002, became the Florence Freedom)
Johnstown Steal (1995–1998, became the Johnstown Johnnies)
Kalamazoo Kings (2001–2010, folded)
Kalamazoo Kodiaks (1996–1998, became the London Werewolves)
Kenosha Mammoths (2003, became the Springfield-Ozark Ducks)
Kentucky Rifles (1993–1994, folded)
Lancaster Scouts (1993–1994, became the Evansville Otters)
London Rippers (2012, folded)
London Werewolves (1999–2001, became the Canton Coyotes)
Mid-Missouri Mavericks (2003–2005, folded)
Midwest Sliders (2008–2009, became the Oakland County Cruisers)
Normal CornBelters (2010–2018, joined the Prospect League)
Newark Buffaloes (1994–1995, became the Kalamazoo Kodiaks)
Oakland County Cruisers (2010-2011, became the London Rippers)
Ohio Valley Redcoats (1993–1998, became the Dubois County Dragons; returned 2005, folded)
Portsmouth Explorers (1993–1995, became the Springfield Capitals)
Richmond Roosters (1995–2005, became the Traverse City Beach Bums)
River City Rascals (1999–2019, folded)
Rockford Aviators (2013–2015, folded)
Rockford RiverHawks (2002–2009, moved to Northern League; returned 2011–2012, replaced by Rockford Aviators)
Slippery Rock Sliders (2007, became the Midwest Sliders)
Southern Illinois Miners (2007–2021, folded)
Springfield Capitals (1996–2001, became the Rockford Riverhawks)
Springfield-Ozark Ducks (2004, became the Ohio Valley Redcoats)
Traverse City Beach Bums (2006–2018, folded)
Tri-State Tomahawks (1993, folded)
West Virginia Coal Sox (1993, folded)
Zanesville Greys (1993–1996, became the River City Rascals)
Équipe Québec (2021, Travel team composed of the Canadian players from Trois-Rivières Aigles and Québec Capitales due to the COVID-19 Pandemic travel restrictions)

Franchise timeline

Champions
1993  Zanesville Greys
1994  Erie Sailors
1995  Johnstown Steal
1996  Springfield Capitals
1997  Canton Crocodiles
1998  Springfield Capitals
1999  London Werewolves
2000  Johnstown Johnnies
2001  Richmond Roosters
2002  Richmond Roosters
2003  Gateway Grizzlies
2004  Rockford Riverhawks
2005  Kalamazoo Kings
2006  Evansville Otters
2007  Windy City ThunderBolts
2008  Windy City ThunderBolts
2009  Lake Erie Crushers
2010  River City Rascals
2011  Joliet Slammers
2012  Southern Illinois Miners
2013  Schaumburg Boomers
2014  Schaumburg Boomers
2015  Traverse City Beach Bums
2016  Evansville Otters
2017  Schaumburg Boomers
2018  Joliet Slammers
2019  River City Rascals
2020 Season cancelled due to COVID-19 pandemic
2021 Schaumburg Boomers
2022 Québec Capitales

Records

Individual career records

Batting

Pitching

See also
Baseball awards#U.S. independent professional leagues

Notes

External links
 Official website
 Frontier League History 
 Frontier League Encyclopedia and History at Baseball Reference

 
Independent baseball leagues in the United States
Baseball leagues in Illinois
Baseball leagues in Indiana
1993 establishments in Illinois
Sports leagues established in 1993
Professional sports leagues in the United States
Baseball leagues in New Jersey
Baseball leagues in New York (state)
Baseball leagues in Pennsylvania
Baseball leagues in Ohio
Baseball leagues in Kentucky
Baseball leagues in Canada